Mendon may refer to:

Places in the United States
 Mendon, Illinois, a village
 Mendon, Massachusetts, a town
 Mendon, Michigan, a village
 Mendon, Missouri, a city
 Mendon, New York, a town
 Mendon, Ohio, a village
 Mendon, Utah, a city
 Mendon, Vermont, a town
 Mendon Township (disambiguation)
 Mendon Peak

People
 Lalaji Mendon, Indian politician
 Mendon Morrill (1902–1961), United States federal judge